A freeway service patrol (motorist assistance patrol, roadway service patrol, safety service patrol, highway assistance patrol, or a courtesy patrol) is a variety of programs implemented by government agencies, typically state Highway Patrols or Departments of Transportation, to reduce traffic congestion and improve highway safety by having specially marked and equipped vehicles patrol designated sections of roadway and provide incident management and motorist assistance at trouble spots they encounter. In some states, the program name is the generic term, as with California's Freeway Service Patrol; in others, the program has an individualized name, as with Indiana's Hoosier Helper program.

Freeway service patrols are typically incorporated into a city or region's intelligent transportation system if it has one, and the United States Department of Transportation has included them as a market package in the National ITS Architecture, designated EM04. That designation emphasizes the role that these patrols can serve in incident or emergency management.

The first freeway service patrol in the United States with continuous regular operations was started in 1960 in Chicago, Illinois. In 1998 the Texas Transportation Institute conducted a study of 54 freeway service patrols in the United States and found that approximately 64% had been started since 1990.

Operations
Despite freeway service patrols' inclusion in the National ITS Architecture, and their increasingly widespread use, there has been no standardization as to how they are operated. Their scope, in terms of number of vehicles on patrol, operating hours, and mileage patrolled, can vary widely. The patrol may operate only during peak hours, with only 30 or 40 operating hours per week, or may operate all 168 hours during a week, as the West Virginia Courtesy Patrol once did. Likewise, the sort of vehicle used in the patrol varies, but may include light-duty pickup trucks, heavy-duty trucks, minivans, or wreckers. In all cases, the vehicle will be marked as a part of the freeway service patrol, and in some states a freeway service patrol vehicle is legally defined as an emergency vehicle. Variation also exists in the role that the agency or agencies responsible for a patrol plays in its operations. For instance, California's Freeway Service Patrol program consists of privately owned and operated wreckers that have contracts with the state, whereas Georgia's HERO program is run directly by the Georgia Department of Transportation: its vehicles are state property and its operators state employees.

Purpose
The variation in freeway service patrol operating characteristics may be considered an example of form follows function, reflecting the relative importance each program assigns to such goals as motorist assistance, incident management, and traffic control. In general, though, the purpose of a freeway service patrol is to use rapid response to reduce traffic congestion. Like many ITS technologies, they are considered a much more cost-effective method to do that than highway construction, especially in metropolitan areas where land for highway expansion is either unavailable or prohibitively expensive. Using such methods as assigning a dollar value to drivers' time and to the exhaust emissions of vehicles stuck in traffic, studies through the early and mid 1990s estimated the benefit-cost ratio for some freeway service patrols may be as high as 36.2:1. Freeway service patrols are also seen as a way to develop goodwill towards the community in which they operate and the government responsible for them.

Opposition
Although motorist surveys reveal that programs, once in place, are extremely popular with the general public, proposed freeway service patrols have met opposition from various groups. Most recently, a proposed freeway service patrol in Hawaii has been placed on hiatus due to objections from a private tow truck company. The towing and recovery industry has been the source of opposition to previous proposals for freeway service patrols, as have small-government advocates.

References

Transportation in the United States